is 
in the narrow sense, the old name of the ethnic group of the Yayoi people who lived in the Japanese archipelago.
In the wider sense, an ethnic group that was mainly active at sea between Mainland China, the Korean Peninsula and the Japanese archipelago.

In general the Wajin that established themself on the Japanese archipelago became the Yayoi people, the ancestors of the Yamato people. The word "Wajin" also refers to related groups outside of Japan.

The first secure appearance of Wajin is in "Treatise on Geography" (地理志) of the Book of Han (漢書). After that, in "Gishi Wajinden" ((魏志倭人伝), a Japanese abbreviation for the "account of Wajin" in the "Biographies of the Wuhuan, Xianbei, and Dongyi" (烏丸鮮卑東夷傳), Volume 30 of the "Book of Wei" (魏書) of the Records of the Three Kingdoms (三国志)), their lifestyle, habits and the way of society are described and by cultural commonality such as lifestyle, customs and languages, they are distinguished themselves from "Kanjin" (han people (韓人)) and "Waijin" (Wai people (濊人)).

Descriptions about Wajin can be found in the Old Book of Tang (945 AD) and the New Book of Tang (1060 AD)

Several linguists, including Alexander Vovin and Juha Janhunen, suggest that Japonic languages were spoken by Wajin and were present in large parts of the southern Korean Peninsula. According to Vovin, these "Peninsular Japonic languages" were replaced by Koreanic-speakers (possibly belonging to the Han-branch). This event was possibly the reason for the Yayoi-migration into Japan. Janhunen also suggests that early Baekje was still predominantly Japonic-speaking before they got replaced or assimilated into the new Korean society.

Origin of the name 
There are several theories as to why certain people living in the Japanese archipelago came to be called "Wajin" (倭人). Cao Wei's official Ru Chun (魏の官人如淳) argued that the origin of Wa was based on the custom of "tattooing (entrusting) to the human face," (人面に入れ墨する(委する)), but denied it because the sounds of Wa (倭) and Yan (委) were different from those of Yan Shigu.
Wajinden

In the early Heian period (794 to 1185), the introduction of "Hiroshi 's private record" ("Nihon Shoki Shiki") describes the theory that the Chinese side wrote down as "Wakoku" (倭の国), because the self-proclaimed "wa" (わ) was used as a theory of a certain person.

In addition, since the word "Wakoku" is obedient (従順) in "Shuowen Jiezi", Ichijō Kaneyoshi chanted "because the human heart of Wajin was obedient" ("Nihon Shoki Sanso"), and many posterity Confucian scholars follow this.

There is also a theory that "Wa" (倭) meant "a short race" (背丈の小さい人種, Setake no chīsai jinshu).

The Japanese philosopher Kinoshita Jun'an states that he was called Wa (倭) because he was a small person (dwarf, 矮人). Arai Hakuseki stated in "Koshitsū" (古史通或問) that the transliteration of "Ohokuni" (オホクニ) was "Wakoku" (倭国). In addition, writer Motohiko Izawa said, "When humans on the continent heard their national name, they answered the name of their own organization, which was the "輪" (Wa = ring, ring moat of a moat village 環濠集落), because the concept of the state still existed at that time." Many theories have been made in this way, but there is no definite one.

There is some disagreement with the interpretation of "Wakoku" (倭(委)奴国) as "Wakoku" (倭の奴の国). Among the scholars of the head family of kanji who interpreted the original "Gishiwajinden", the word "yatsu" (奴) used to mean a derogatory term for a woman, and the female kingdom, Wa (倭), was called "Wakoku" (倭奴国). It is the theory that it should be called and should be regarded as a derogatory term for the book-sealing nation based on Chinese thought and the current nation's Wakoku (倭国). However, it is the view that such derogatory terms are gradually becoming obsolete even in later Sinocentric countries as the envoys to Sui and Tang came to be used.

As Baiyue and Wu people 
The ethnic concept of "Wa-zoku (倭族)" encompasses a wide range of regions and does not limit to the Wajin of the Japanese archipelago. According to Kenzaburo's theory, Wa-zoku are Wajin who came to the Japanese archipelago with rice crop, whose ancestor was the same as the Yayoi people. Torigoe says that the original place of the Wa-zoku is Yunnan.

Suwa Haruo considered Wa-zoku to be part of Baiyue (百越) in southern China.

The Wajin (and the Yayoi) are possibly descendants of the Wu people. A large paddy ruins in the area was created around 450 BC, the Warring States period, in Kyushu, and a record states that "Wajin [were the] self-named descendants of Zhou". An influential theory states that the Wu people of the Yangtze River area that followed the hydroponic rice cultivation culture, which is also a symbol of Yangtze civilization, drifted to the Japanese archipelago around the 5th century BC, in collaboration with the destruction of the Kingdom of Wu.

Genetics

References 

Ancient Japan
Ethnic groups in Japan
Tribes of ancient Japan